The schools of Mahayana Buddhism developed several different schemes of doctrinal classification (Chinese: 教判, pinyin: jiàopan, Japanese: kyōhan, Korean:교판, RR: gyopan).

History
The classification of Buddha teachings is discussed very early by Mahayana Buddhists in China. In 600 AD there were 10 main classifications.
And it continued to develop. Kukai in Japan wrote Himitsumandara jūjūshinron (祕密曼荼羅十住心論, Treatise on The Ten Stages of the Development of Mind) and Enchin also wrote his classification. Tibetan Buddhists also developed different classifications.

Five Periods and Eight Teachings 
Zhiyi of the Tiantai school categorized the Buddha's teachings in the Mohe Zhiguan (摩訶止觀) and Fahua Xuanyi (法華玄義). These are classed under what are now known as the Five Periods and Eight Teachings (五時八教).

The Five Periods are as follows:
Flower Ornament Period (華嚴時)
Āgamas Period (阿含時)
Vaipūlya (方等時)
Prajñā (般若時)
Lotus-Nirvāṇa Period (法華涅槃時). 

The Eight Teachings are subdivided into two groups:

The Fourfold Methods of Conversion (化儀四教)
Sudden Teaching (頓教)
Gradual Teaching (漸教)
Secret Teaching (秘密教)
Variable Teaching (不定教)
The Fourfold Doctrines of Conversion (化法四教)
Tripitaka Teaching (三藏教)
Shared Teaching (通教)
Distinctive Teaching (別教)
Complete Teaching (圓教)
Tiantai followed this classification.

Five Divisions and Ten Schools
Fazang wrote Huayan Yisheng Jiaoyi Fenqi Zhang (華嚴一乘教義分齊章) in which he classified Buddhist teachings into Five Divisions and Ten Schools (五教十宗). 

Hīnayāna teaching (小乘教)
The doctrine of the reality of both the self and the dharmas (我法俱有宗) (Vātsīputrīya)
The doctrine that the self is non-substantial but the dharmas are real, and that the past, present, and future exist independently (法有我無宗) (Sarvāstivāda)
The doctrine that the reality of the dharmas exists only in the present and not in the past or the future (法無去來宗) (Mahāsāṃghika)
The doctrine that the present contains both reality and unreality (現通假實宗) (Prajñaptivāda)
The doctrine that worldly truth is unreal, but that Buddhist truth is real (俗妄真實宗) (Lokottaravāda)
The doctrine that all things and phenomena are mere names without self-nature (諸法但有宗) (Ekavyāvahārika)
Elementary Mahāyāna teaching (大乘初教)
The doctrine that maintains the non-substantiality of all things (一切皆空宗) (Sānlùn)
Final Mahāyāna teaching(大乘終教)
The doctrine that recognizes an unchanging truth that is the essence (bhūtatathatā) of all things(真實不空宗) (Tiāntāi)
Sudden Mahāyāna teaching (大乘頓教) 
The doctrine that the truth lies in the mystic realm beyond the polarity of subject and object. (相想俱絕宗) (Chán)
Perfect Teaching (of the One Vehicle) (一乘圓教)
The doctrine that all things exist in perfect harmony and interrelation (圓明具德宗) (Huáyán)
The Huayan school followed this classification.

Nine yanas
There are nine yanas in Nyingma teachings.

Notes

Bibliography
 
 Kanno, Hiroshi (2000). A Comparison of Zhiji`s and Jizang`s Views of the Lotus Sutra:, Annual Report of The International Research Institute for Advanced Buddhology at Soka University, vol III, 125–147
 Liu, Ming-Wood (1993). The Chinese Madhyamaka Practice of "p'an-chiao": The Case of Chi-Tsang, Bulletin of the School of Oriental and African Studies, University of London 56 (1), 96–118 
 Mun, Chanju (2006). The History of Doctrinal Classification in Chinese Buddhism: A Study of the Panjiao Systems. Lanham, MD: University Press of America. 

Classification systems